The following lists events that happened during 1982 in Kenya.

Incumbents
President: Daniel arap Moi
Vice-President: Mwai Kibaki
Chief Justice: Sir James Wicks then Sir Alfred Simpson

Events
 August 1 - 1982 Kenyan coup d'état attempt. The attempt took place during the political administration of Daniel arap Moi.
 SoNy Sugar F.C. established

Births

 January 3 - Philip Maiyo, international volleyball player

Deaths

References 

 
Years of the 20th century in Kenya